Ngiri is a Bantu language closely related to Lingala.

Maho (2009) lists C311 Mabaale (Mabale), C312 Ndoobo (Ndobo), C313 Litoka, C314 Balobo, and C315 Enga (Baenga-Bolombo) as distinct languages.

References

Ngondi-Ngiri languages